Wilfred Glyn Greatorex (27 May 1921 – 14 October 2002) was an English television and film writer, script editor and producer. He was creator of such series as Secret Army, 1990, Plane Makers and its sequel The Power Game, Hine, Brett, Man at the Top, Man From Haven and The Inheritors. He also wrote the screenplay for the 1969 film Battle of Britain. He was described by The Guardian newspaper as "one of the most prolific and assured of television script-writers and editors from the 1960s into the 1980s". Starting off as a journalist, he got his big break as a TV writer on Lew Grade's ATV service writing dramas about journalism, such as Deadline Midnight and Front Page Story. He wrote a number of books, including one about the Battle of Arnhem as ghostwriter for Major General Roy Urquhart.

As a TV script editor he also worked on series such as Danger Man and was also creator/producer of The Inheritors, Hine and The Power Game. Papers discovered at a Norfolk auction house in 2011 reveal that 'Hine' had a budget of £84,000, the equivalent of close to £1m some forty years later.

In 1977, he came up with the dystopian drama series 1990 for BBC2, starring Edward Woodward. Greatorex dubbed the series "Nineteen Eighty-Four plus six". Over its two series it portrayed "a Britain in which the rights of the individual had been replaced by the concept of the common good – or, as I put it more brutally, a consensus tyranny." The same year he also devised (with Gerard Glaister) the BBC1 wartime drama Secret Army. The show later inspired the sitcom parody 'Allo 'Allo!.

When talking about his writing style he said "I am opposed to soft-centred characters, which is why I don't create a lot of Robin Hoods. The world's full of hard cases, real villains. And they need to be confronted with other characters just as hard."

His last series for television was Airline in 1982 (starring Roy Marsden). He died in of renal failure in Buckinghamshire in 2002.

Writing credits

Books

 Based on the BBC television series.

 Based on the Yorkshire Television series.

References

External links
Screenonline page on Wilfred Greatorex

Obituary in The Guardian
Obituary in The Times

1921 births
2002 deaths
English television writers
English science fiction writers
20th-century English novelists
Writers from Liverpool
20th-century English screenwriters